The Tortricini are a tribe of tortrix moths.

Genera

Former genera
Sociosa

References 

 , 2005: World Catalogue of Insects vol. 5 Tortricidae.
 , 1986: A study of the Chinese Eboda Walker (Lepidoptera: Tortricidae). Sinozoologia 4: 151-154.
 , 1981: Nigerian Tortricini (Lepidoptera, Tortricidae).  Razowski, Acta Zoologica Cracoviensia 25(14): 319-340.
 , 1990: Descriptions and notes on tropical Tortricini (Lepidoptera: Tortricidae). Acta Zoologica Cracoviensia 33(28): 575-594.
 , 2005: Notes and descriptions of primitive Tortricini from Tropical Africa, with a list of Asian taxa (Lepidoptera: Tortricidae). Shilap Revista de Lepidopterologia 33 (132): 423-436. .
 , 2012: Tortricines in the fauna of Nepal (Lepidoptera: Tortricidae). Polish Journal of Entomology 81 (1): 91-99. Full article: .
 , 2012: Tortricidae (Lepidoptera) from the Tervuren Museum: 1. Tortricini and Chlidanotini. Polish Journal of Entomology 81 (2): 129-143. Abstract and full article: .
 , 2012: Descriptions of new Tortricini from the Oriental and Australian regions (Lepidoptera: Tortricidae). Shilap Revista de Lepidopterologia 40 (159): 315-335.

 
Moth tribes